Neuburg is an Amt in the district of Nordwestmecklenburg, in Mecklenburg-Vorpommern, Germany. The seat of the Amt is in Neuburg.

The Amt Neuburg consists of the following municipalities:
Benz
Blowatz
Boiensdorf 
Hornstorf 
Krusenhagen
Neuburg

Ämter in Mecklenburg-Western Pomerania